Kranz is a German language-derived surname; in German the word means wreath.

Geographical distribution
As of 2014, 61.6% of all known bearers of the surname Kranz were residents of Germany (frequency 1:4,603), 26.3% of the United States (1:48,490), 2.3% of Australia (1:37,147), 2.2% of Brazil (1:326,176), 1.9% of Austria (1:16,156), 1.7% of Poland (1:79,683) and 1.0% of Canada (1:129,570).

In Germany, the frequency of the surname was higher than national average (1:4,603) in the following regions:
 1. Rhineland-Palatinate (1:2,177)
 2. Berlin (1:3,169)
 3. Hesse (1:3,245)
 4. Saxony-Anhalt (1:3,515)
 5. Thuringia (1:3,716)
 6. Mecklenburg-Vorpommern (1:3,798)
 7. Brandenburg (1:4,147)
 8. North Rhine-Westphalia (1:4,315)

People
 Ashley Kranz, winner of CMT Canada's "CMT Casting Call 2007"
 Bernhard Kranz, German highly decorated Hauptmann der Reserve in the Wehrmacht during World War II
 Carl Frederick Kranz, German-born minister and teacher, founder of the German Evangelical Proseminary, founding president of Elmhurst College in Elmhurst, Illinois
 Fran Kranz, American actor
 Gene Kranz, American NASA flight director and manager
 George Kranz, German dance music singer and percussionist
 Hugo Kranz, German-born businessman and political figure in Ontario, Canada
 Jacob ben Wolf Kranz, Jewish Lithuania (Belarus)-born preacher (maggid)
 James P. Kranz Jr., American lawyer
 Ken Kranz, American NFL football player
 Markus Kranz, German football coach and former player
 Paula Dean Broadwell (née Kranz), American writer, academic, and anti-terrorism professional
 Stanislaus Kranz, birth name of Stanley Cortez, an American cinematographer
 Walther Kranz, German Classical philologist and historian of philosophy

Places
 Kranz Peak, a peak in the Queen Maud Mountains
 Kręcko (German: Kranz), a village in western Poland
 Kranzburg, town in South Dakota

Other uses include:

 Frankfurter Kranz, a cake specialty believed to originate from Frankfurt am Main, Germany
 Kranz anatomy, a characteristic leaf anatomy often possessed by C4 plants
 Professor Kranz tedesco di Germania, a 1978 Italian comedy film

References

German-language surnames
Jewish surnames

de:Kranz (Begriffsklärung)